Acylase may refer to:
 Amidase, an enzyme
 Aminoacylase, an enzyme